Gonystylus decipiens is a species of tree in the Thymelaeaceae family. It is endemic to Borneo where it is confined to Sarawak.

References

decipiens
Endemic flora of Borneo
Trees of Borneo
Flora of Sarawak
Taxonomy articles created by Polbot